Ferdinand Keller may refer to:

 Ferdinand Keller (archaeologist) (1800–1881), Swiss archaeologist and prehistorian
 Ferdinand Keller (footballer) (born 1946), retired German footballer
 Ferdinand Keller (painter) (1842–1922), German painter